The 2022–23 Loyola Marymount Lions men's basketball team represents Loyola Marymount University during the 2022–23 NCAA Division I men's basketball season. The Lions are led by third-year head coach Stan Johnson and play their home games at Gersten Pavilion in Los Angeles, California as members of the West Coast Conference.

Previous season
The Lions finished the 2021–22 season 11–18, 3–12 in WCC play to finish in ninth place. They defeated Pacific in the first round of the WCC tournament before losing in the second round to BYU.

Offseason

Departures

Incoming transfers

Recruiting classes

2022 recruiting class

2023 recruiting class

Roster

Schedule and results

|-
!colspan=12 style=| Non-conference regular season

  

|-
!colspan=12 style=|WCC regular season

|-
!colspan=12 style=|WCC tournament

Source

References

Loyola Marymount Lions men's basketball seasons
Loyola Marymount
Loyola Marymount basketball, men
Loyola Marymount basketball, men
Loyola Marymount basketball, men
Loyola Marymount basketball, men